The 2018 Segunda División season, was the 73rd edition of the second tier of Federación Peruana de Futbol. The tournament started on 8 April 2018 and ended on 2 December 2018.

Competition modus
The season was divided into two phases, a home-and-away round-robin stage and a liguilla stage. The top seven teams at the end of the first stage moved on to liguilla. The first placed team received a bye to the semi-finals. The other six teams played quarter-final, two-leg matches. The semi-finals and final also played over two legs. The liguilla champion was promoted to the 2019 Torneo Descentralizado and the tournament championship.

Teams
A total of 15 teams played in the league, including 12 sides from the 2017 season, two relegated from the 2018 Torneo Descentralizado and one promoted from the 2018 Copa Perú.

Juan Aurich, Alianza Atlético, and Atlético Grau debuted in their season in the second division of Peruvian football. The two relegated clubs were La Bocana and Sport Áncash who will play in the 2018 Copa Perú starting in the Departamental Stage.

League table

Results

Liguilla

Third-place play-off

Promotion play-off

See also
 2018 Torneo Descentralizado
 2018 Copa Perú

References

External links
  
Peruvian Segunda División news at Peru.com 
Peruvian Segunda División statistics and news at Dechalaca.com 
Peruvian Segunda División news at SegundaPerú.com 
 RSSSF

2018
2018 in Peruvian football